Bârsănești is a commune in Bacău County, Western Moldavia, Romania. It is composed of four villages: Albele, Bârsănești, Brătești, and Caraclău.

References

Communes in Bacău County
Localities in Western Moldavia